Judge Nixon may refer to:

John T. Nixon (1820–1889), judge of the United States District Court for the District of New Jersey
John Trice Nixon (1933–2019), judge of the United States District Court for the Middle District of Tennessee
Walter Nixon (born 1928), judge of the United States District Court for the Southern District of Mississippi